In Greek mythology, Ameinias was a young man who fell in love with the beautiful Beotian hunter Narcissus, who had already spurned his male suitors, according to the version of Narcissus's myth by Conon (Narrations, 24).

Mythology 
Narcissus also spurned Ameinias and gave him a sword. The latter committed suicide at Narcissus's doorstep after being rejected by him. He had prayed to Nemesis to give Narcissus a lesson for all the pain he provoked. Narcissus walked by a pool of water and decided to drink some. He saw his reflection, became entranced by it, and killed himself because he could not have his object of desire, or gazing endlessly at the image, he slowly pined away and was transformed by the nymphs into a narcissus flower. Others say he was instead filled with remorse and killed himself beside the pool—and from his dying life's blood the flower was born.

Depictions of Ameinias 
The BBC TV series Telling Tales retells the Narcissus myth in a modern setting where Narcissus is a handsome, popular kid at his school and Ameinias is his friend.

References

Further reading 
 Conon, Fifty Narrations, surviving as one-paragraph summaries in the Bibliotheca (Library) of Photius, Patriarch of Constantinople, translated from the Greek by Brady Kiesling. Online version at the Topos Text Project.

Boeotian characters in Greek mythology
LGBT themes in Greek mythology